Greek orthography has used a variety of diacritics starting in the Hellenistic period. The more complex polytonic orthography, which includes five diacritics, notates Ancient Greek phonology. The simpler monotonic orthography, introduced in 1982, corresponds to Modern Greek phonology, and requires only two diacritics.

Polytonic orthography is the standard system for Ancient Greek and Medieval Greek. The acute accent (´), the circumflex (ˆ), and the grave accent (`) indicate different kinds of pitch accent.

Monotonic orthography is the standard system for Modern Greek. A tonos and a diaeresis can be combined on a single vowel to indicate a stressed vowel after a hiatus, as in the verb  ("I feed").

History 

The original Greek alphabet did not have diacritics. The Greek alphabet is attested since the 8th century BC, and until 403 BC, variations of the Greek alphabet—which exclusively used what are now known as capitals—were used in different cities and areas. From 403 on, the Athenians decided to employ a version of the Ionian alphabet. With the spread of Koine Greek, a continuation of the Attic dialect, the Ionic alphabet superseded the other alphabets, known as epichoric, with varying degrees of speed. The Ionian alphabet, however, also only consisted of capitals.

Introduction of breathings 

Introduction of accents 
During the Hellenistic period (3rd century BC), Aristophanes of Byzantium introduced the breathings—marks of aspiration (the aspiration however being already noted on certain inscriptions, not by means of diacritics but by regular letters or modified letters)—and the accents, of which the use started to spread, to become standard in the Middle Ages. It was not until the 2nd century AD that accents and breathings appeared sporadically in papyri. The need for the diacritics arose from the gradual divergence between spelling and pronunciation.

Uncial script 

The majuscule, i.e., a system where text is written entirely in capital letters, was used until the 8th century, when the minuscule polytonic supplanted it.

Grave accent rule 
By the Byzantine period, the modern rule which turns an acute accent (oxeia) on the last syllable into a grave accent (bareia)—except before a punctuation sign or an enclitic—had been firmly established. Certain authors have argued that the grave originally denoted the absence of accent; the modern rule is, in their view, a purely orthographic convention. Originally, certain proclitic words lost their accent before another word and received the grave, and later this was generalized to all words in the orthography. Others—drawing on, for instance, evidence from ancient Greek music—consider that the grave was "linguistically real" and expressed a word-final modification of the acute pitch.

Stress accent 
In the later development of the language, the ancient pitch accent was replaced by an intensity or stress accent, making the three types of accent identical, and the  sound became silent.

Simplification
At the beginning of the 20th century (official since the 1960s), the grave was replaced by the acute, and the iota subscript and the breathings on the rho were abolished, except in printed texts. Greek typewriters from that era did not have keys for the grave accent or the iota subscript, and these diacritics were also not taught in primary schools where instruction was in Demotic Greek.

Official adoption of monotonic system
Following the official adoption of the demotic form of the language, the monotonic orthography was imposed by law in 1982. The latter uses only the acute accent (or sometimes a vertical bar, intentionally distinct from any of the traditional accents) and diaeresis and omits the breathings. This simplification has been criticized on the grounds that polytonic orthography provides a cultural link to the past.

Modern use of polytonic system
Some individuals, institutions, and publishers continue to prefer the polytonic system (with or without grave accent), though an official reintroduction of the polytonic system does not seem probable. The Greek Orthodox church, the daily newspaper Estia, as well as books written in Katharevousa continue to use the polytonic orthography. Though the polytonic system was not used in Classical Greece, these critics argue that modern Greek, as a continuation of Byzantine and post-medieval Greek, should continue their writing conventions.

Some textbooks of Ancient Greek for foreigners have retained the breathings, but dropped all the accents in order to simplify the task for the learner.

Description
Polytonic Greek uses many different diacritics in several categories. At the time of Ancient Greek, each of these marked a significant distinction in pronunciation.

Monotonic orthography for Modern Greek uses only two diacritics, the tonos and diaeresis (sometimes used in combination) that have significance in pronunciation. Initial  is no longer pronounced, and so the rough and smooth breathings are no longer necessary. The unique pitch patterns of the three accents have disappeared, and only a stress accent remains. The iota subscript was a diacritic invented to mark an etymological vowel that was no longer pronounced, so it was dispensed with as well.

The transliteration of Greek names follows Latin transliteration of Ancient Greek; modern transliteration is different, and does not distinguish many letters and digraphs that have merged by iotacism.

Accents

The accents are placed on an accented vowel or on the last of the two vowels of a diphthong (ά, but αί) and indicated pitch patterns in Ancient Greek. The precise nature of the patterns is not certain, but the general nature of each is known.

The acute accent ( or "high") '' marked high pitch on a short vowel or rising pitch on a long vowel.

The acute is also used on the first of two (or occasionally three) successive vowels in Modern Greek to indicate that they are pronounced together as a stressed diphthong.

The grave accent ( or "low", modern varia) '' marked normal or low pitch.

The grave was originally written on all unaccented syllables. By the Byzantine period it was only used to replace the acute at the end of a word if another accented word follows immediately without punctuation.

The circumflex '' marked high and falling pitch within one syllable. In distinction to the angled Latin circumflex, the Greek circumflex is printed in the form of either a tilde or an inverted breve. It was also known as   "high-low" or "acute-grave", and its original form was from a combining of the acute and grave diacritics. Because of its compound nature, it only appeared on long vowels or diphthongs.

Breathings

The breathings were written over a vowel or ρ.

The rough breathing (Latin )—''—indicates a voiceless glottal fricative before the vowel in Ancient Greek. In Greek grammar, this is known as aspiration. This is different from aspiration in phonetics, which applies to consonants, not vowels.
 Rho (Ρρ) at the beginning of a word always takes rough breathing, probably marking unvoiced pronunciation. In Latin, this was transcribed as rh.
 Upsilon (Υυ) at the beginning of a word always takes rough breathing. Thus, words from Greek begin with hy-, never with y-.

A double rho in the middle of a word was originally written with smooth breathing on the first rho and rough breathing on the second one. In Latin, this was transcribed as rrh (diarrhoea or diarrhea).

Coronis

The coronis marks a vowel contracted by crasis. It was formerly an apostrophe placed after the contracted vowel, but is now placed over the vowel and is identical to the smooth breathing. Unlike the smooth breathing, it often occurs inside a word.

Subscript

The iota subscript—''—is placed under the long vowels ᾱ, η, and ω to mark the ancient long diphthongs ᾱι, ηι, and ωι, in which the ι is no longer pronounced.

Adscript
Next to a capital, the iota subscript is usually written as a lower-case letter (Αι), in which case it is called iota adscript.

Diaeresis

The distinction between two separate vowels and an unstressed diphthong is not always clear, although two separate vowels are far more common.

The diaeresis can be combined with the acute, grave and circumflex but never with breathings, since the letter with the diaeresis cannot be the first vowel of the word.

In Modern Greek, the combination of the acute and diaeresis indicates a stressed vowel after a hiatus.

Vowel length

Nonstandard diacritics

Caron
In some modern non-standard orthographies of Greek dialects, such as Cypriot Greek and Griko, a caron (ˇ) may be used on some consonants to show a palatalized pronunciation. Latin diacritics on Greek letters may not be supported by many fonts, and as a fall-back a caron may be replaced by an iota ⟨ι⟩ following the consonant.

Examples of Greek letters with a combining caron and their pronunciation: α̌ , γκ̌  & , ζ̌ , κ̌  & , λ̌ , μ̌ , μπ̌ , νγκ̌ , ντ̌ , ν̌ , ξ̌ , ο̌ , π̌ , ρ̌ , σ̌ ς̌ , τ̌ , τζ̌ , τσ̌ τς̌  & , ψ̌ , ω̌ .

Dot above
A dot diacritic was used above some consonants and vowels in Karamanli Turkish, which was written with the Greek alphabet.

Position in letters
Diacritics are written above lower-case letters and at the upper left of capital letters. In the case of a digraph, the second vowel takes the diacritics. A breathing diacritic is written to the left of an acute or grave accent but below a circumflex. Accents are written above a diaeresis or between its two dots. Diacritics are only written on capital letters if they are at the beginning of a word with the exception of the diaeresis, which is always written. Diacritics can be found above capital letters in medieval texts.

Examples

Computer encoding
There have been problems in representing polytonic Greek on computers, and in displaying polytonic Greek on computer screens and printouts, but these have largely been overcome by the advent of Unicode and appropriate fonts.

IETF language tag
The IETF language tags have registered subtag codes for the different orthographies:
  for monotonic Greek.
  for polytonic Greek.

Unicode 
While the tónos of monotonic orthography looks similar to the oxeîa of polytonic orthography in most fonts, Unicode has historically separate symbols for letters with these diacritics. For example, the monotonic "Greek small letter alpha with tónos" is at U+03AC, while the polytonic "Greek small letter alpha with oxeîa" is at U+1F71. The monotonic and polytonic accent however have been de jure equivalent since 1986, and accordingly the oxeîa diacritic in Unicode decomposes canonically to the monotonic tónos—both are underlyingly treated as equivalent to the multiscript acute accent, U+0301, since letters with oxia decompose to letters with tonos, which decompose in turn to base letter plus multiscript acute accent. For example:
 U+1F71 GREEK SMALL LETTER ALPHA WITH OXIA
 ➔ U+03AC GREEK SMALL LETTER ALPHA WITH TONOS
 ➔ U+03B1 GREEK SMALL LETTER ALPHA, U+0301 COMBINING ACUTE ACCENT.

Below are the accented characters provided in Unicode. In the uppercase letters, the iota adscript may appear as subscript depending on font.

Upper case

Lower case

See also

 Acute accent
 Voiceless glottal fricative
 Diaeresis – Synaeresis
 Greek language
 Koine Greek phonology
 Modern Greek grammar
 Greek alphabet
 Greek language question
 Greek ligatures
 Greek braille
 Greek minuscule
 Textual criticism
 Aristarchian symbols
 Obelism
 Dagger (typography)
 Greek numerals
 Attic numerals
 Isopsephy
 Ancient Greek Musical Notation
 Byzantine Musical Symbols

References

Further reading
  Panayotakis is critical of the adoption of monotonic, and also provides a useful historical sketch.
  See also: .

External links

General information:
 Accentuation history and tutorial
 Citizens' Movement for the Reintroduction of the Polytonic System, in Greek and English
 How the law to abandon polytonic orthography was passed in the Greek parliament, in Greek
 Greek polytonic to monotonic converter (free online tool)
 Program that converts (correct) written monotonic texts into polytonic texts

Polytonic Greek fonts:
 Greek Font Society public domain polytonic fonts 
 Public domain Greek polytonic unicode fonts
 Athena, public domain polytonic Greek font

How-to guides for polytonic keyboard layouts:
 Google Docs guide for Linux Covers installation of layouts, use of dead-keys etc. Updated to 2010.

Diacritics
 
Diacritics
Diacritics
Diacritics
Orthographies by language
Orthography
Spelling reform
Keyboard layouts